Parnimeh (also Romanized as Parnīmeh) is a village in Rudbar Rural District, Ruydar District, Khamir County, Hormozgan Province, Iran. At the 2006 census, its population was 121, in 23 families.

References 

Populated places in Khamir County